Chu Lai (1847–1906) was a businessman from Panyu, China who migrated to British Columbia in 1860.

Biography 
He was considered to be one of the wealthiest Chinese merchants in British Columbia. In 1876 he opened a general store selling all sorts of Chinese products. The Wing Chong Company was the largest employer of Chinese workers and artisans. Chu Lai had no difficulty finding employees because his store was a meeting-place for Chinese immigrants.

He was married to four women, two in China and two in Canada. This arrangement was, according to historians, to facilitate the administration of his business on two continents.

In 1885, Chu and another Chinese were accused of not having paid their annual $10 tax, which the Chinese Regulation Act had levied on all Asiatic adults in the province. Chu appealed to the British Columbia Supreme Court, which found that the tax was beyond the powers of the province. Chu Lai played an important role in the education of Chinese in the province, in protesting against the creation of a separate school system for the Chinese. During his lifetime, he was not well known among white Canadians. It was his funeral that interested the British press:
"The impressive funeral to which Chu Lai was entitled showed that he had entered the elite of the Chinese community."

Sources 
 T. J. Stanley, "Chu Lai" at Dictionary of Canadian Biography online

1847 births
1906 deaths
Businesspeople from British Columbia
Chu Lai
Chu Lai
Qing dynasty emigrants to Canada
Naturalized citizens of Canada
People from Panyu District